State Highway 7 (SH 7) is an  state highway in  Colorado, United States. It is located in the north-central portion of the state, traversing the mountains on the east of the continental divide south of Estes Park as well as portions of the Colorado Piedmont north of Denver. The northwestern segment of the highway is part of the Peak to Peak Scenic Byway and furnishes an access route to Estes Park, Colorado and Rocky Mountain National Park. In its southeast portion it skirts the northern end of the Denver Metropolitan Area, providing an access route connecting Boulder, Lafayette and Brighton with Interstate 25 (I-25) and Interstate 76 (I-76).

The western terminus is at the junction of U.S. Route 36 at North St. Vrain and South St. Vrain avenues in Estes Park. The eastern terminus is at I-76 exit 25 in Brighton. The portion between Lyons and Boulder, where it is concurrent with US 36, is unsigned. The highway is two lanes along the entire route except for portions in the cities and towns.

Route description

From Estes Park, SH 7 climbs into the mountains of southwest Larimer County and skirts the east side of Rocky Mountain National Park, providing the closest vehicle approach to the popular trailhead to the summit of Longs Peak. Near the community of Raymond it intersects State Highway 72, which takes the Peak to Peak Scenic Byway designation with it to the south, while SH 7 turns to the east and follows South St. Vrain Creek downstream onto the piedmont at Lyons, where it intersects US 36. South of Lyons it is concurrent with US 36 along the base of the foothills to Boulder. (This section is signed only as US 36.) It is also concurrent with State Highway 119 on 28th Street within Boulder. It runs straight east from Boulder as the extension of Arapahoe Avenue to U.S. Route 287 (US 287) north of Lafayette, jogging  to the south while concurrent with US 287, then going due east again, as Baseline Road, to I-25.

History

The route was established in the 1920s. It began at Estes Park and traveled south to Lyons, then south to Boulder. It then continued to its terminus at U.S. Route 87 (now also I-25) east of Lafayette. The route was paved from Boulder to Lafayette in 1932 and from Estes Park to Lyons in 1936. In 1939, the route was extended southeast to Brighton, where it met U.S. Route 6; this extension was paved by 1946. In 2006, the section on Broadway between US 36 and Canyon Boulevard in Boulder was turned back to the City of Boulder, and SH 7 was rerouted to be concurrent (unsigned) with US 36 on 28th Street through Boulder.

Major intersections

Related route

SH 7 Bus.'s western terminus is at SH 7 in Allenspark, and the eastern terminus is at SH 7 east of Allenspark.

See also

 List of state highways in Colorado

References

External links

007
Transportation in Larimer County, Colorado
Transportation in Boulder County, Colorado
Transportation in Weld County, Colorado
Transportation in Broomfield, Colorado
Transportation in Adams County, Colorado
Estes Park, Colorado
Boulder, Colorado